Sorn may refer to:

Places
Sorn, East Ayrshire, a village in Scotland
Sorn Castle, East Ayrshire, Scotland
River Sorn, Islay, Scotland
Sørn and Bernt, rocks off the coast of South Georgia

People
 Sorn Davin (born 1992), taekwondo practitioner
 Sorn Silpabanleng (1881–1944), Thai musician better known as Luang Pradit Pairoh
 Sorn Inthor, Cambodian politician 
 Sorn Seavmey (born 1995), Cambodian taekwondo practitioner 
 Nai Htaw Sorn (1917–2014), Mon (Burmese) political activist
 Chonnasorn Sajakul, Thai singer known as Sorn
 James Gordon McIntyre, Lord Sorn (1896–1983), Scottish law lord and First World War officer

Other uses
A fictional species of Martian humanoid in Out of the Silent Planet by C. S. Lewis
SORN, Statutory Off Road Notification, exempting a vehicle from UK Vehicle Excise Duty